Farsiat or Farsiyat or Farseyat may refer to:
 Farsiat-e Bozorg
 Farsiat-e Kuchek